Ferdinand Amadi (born 18 September 1970) is an athlete from the Central African Republic. He represented his country at the 1992 Summer Olympics.

Achievements
All results regarding marathon, unless stated otherwise

References

External links

1970 births
Living people
Central African Republic male long-distance runners
Olympic athletes of the Central African Republic
Athletes (track and field) at the 1992 Summer Olympics
Central African Republic male marathon runners